There are over 9000 Grade I listed buildings in England.  This page is a list of these buildings in the county of West Midlands, by borough.

Birmingham

Wolverhampton

Coventry

Dudley

Sandwell

Solihull

See also
Grade II* listed buildings in the West Midlands
Listed pubs in Birmingham

Notes

References 
National Heritage List for England

West Midlands
 
Lists of listed buildings in the West Midlands (county)